Always & Forever is the second studio album by American country music singer Randy Travis. It was released on May 4, 1987, by Warner Bros. Records. Released from this album were the singles "Too Gone Too Long", "I Won't Need You Anymore (Always and Forever)", "Forever and Ever, Amen" and "I Told You So", all of which reached Number One on the Billboard Hot Country Songs charts.

The track "What'll You Do About Me" has been covered by several artists, including single releases by Steve Earle, The Forester Sisters and Doug Supernaw. "I Told You So" was covered by Carrie Underwood as a duet with Travis on her 2007 album Carnival Ride, from which it was released as a single in January 2009.

On the award-winning podcast Never Not Funny, it was revealed that the album was comedian Jimmy Pardo's second-favorite album of 1987, just behind Don Dixon's Romeo at Juilliard

Track listing

Production
Engineer Outboard Gear Service: Studio Equipment Rental (co owner: Pamela M Jones)

Personnel

 Baillie & The Boys – background vocals
 Russ Barenberg – acoustic guitar
 Michael Brooks – background vocals
 Dennis Burnside – keyboards
 Larry Byrom – acoustic guitar
 Mark Casstevens – acoustic guitar
 Jerry Douglas – dobro
 Paul Franklin – pedabro
 Steve Gibson – acoustic guitar, electric guitar
 Doyle Grisham – steel guitar
 Sherilyn Huffman – background vocals
 David Hungate – bass guitar
 Kirk "Jelly Roll" Johnson – harmonica
 Dennis Locorriere – background vocals
 Larrie Londin – drums
 Terry McMillan – percussion, harmonica
 Brent Mason – acoustic guitar, electric guitar
 Mark O'Connor – fiddle
 Paul Overstreet – background vocals
 Lisa Silver – background vocals
 James Stroud – drums
 Diane Tidwell – background vocals
 Randy Travis – acoustic guitar, lead vocals
 Jack Williams – bass guitar
 Dennis Wilson – background vocals
 Photography – Empire Studio (Scott Bonner/Ron Keith)

Charts

Weekly charts

Year-end charts

Certifications

Notes
Comedian Jimmy Pardo (Host of the award winning podcast Never Not Funny) named this his second favorite album of 1987.

References

1987 albums
Randy Travis albums
Warner Records albums
Albums produced by Kyle Lehning
Canadian Country Music Association Top Selling Album albums